The Louisville Cardinals baseball team is the varsity intercollegiate baseball program of the University of Louisville, located in Louisville, Kentucky. The program was a member of the NCAA Division I American Athletic Conference for the 2014 season and joined the Atlantic Coast Conference in July 2014. The Cardinals have played at Jim Patterson Stadium since the venue opened during the 2005 season. Dan McDonnell has been the program's head coach since the start of the 2007 season. As of the end of the 2017 season, the program has appeared in 13 NCAA Tournaments and five College World Series. In conference postseason play, it has won two Big East Conference baseball tournaments. In regular season play, it has won two Metro Conference titles, four Big East Conference titles, one American Athletic Conference title, and four Atlantic Coast Conference titles. Louisville also set the ACC record for most conference wins in a season with 25 during the 2015 season.

As of July 20, 2019, 19 former Cardinals have appeared in Major League Baseball. Seven former Cardinals have appeared in MLB games during the 2019 season: Nick Burdi, Adam Engel, Chad Green, Matt Koch, Brendan McKay, Josh Rogers, Will Smith, and  Nick Solak

Conference affiliations

 Independent (1909–1912, 1920–1922, 1924–1942, 1945–1962)
 Missouri Valley Conference (1963–1975)
 Metro Conference (1976–1995)
 Conference USA (1996–2005)
 Big East Conference (2006–2013)
 American Athletic Conference (2014)
 Atlantic Coast Conference (2014–present)

Venues

Early venues
Early in its history, Louisville played many home games at Eclipse Park in Louisville, until the venue burned down in 1922. Other early venues included the Belknap Campus Diamond, Shawnee Park, Manual Stadium, and St. Xavier Field.

Parkway Field

Parkway Field, located on the university's campus, was the program's home sporadically from 1923 to 1960 and full-time from 1961 to 1995.  The grandstand that allowed professional baseball to be played at the venue in the first half of the 20th century was torn down in 1961.

Derby City Field
For all of the 1996 and 1997 seasons and parts of the 1998 and 1999 seasons, the Cardinals played at Derby City Field.

Old Cardinal Stadium

From the start of the 1998 season through mid-April 2005, Louisville played at Old Cardinal Stadium.  The Cardinals played a full schedule at Cardinal Stadium from 2000 to 2004 and portions of their schedule there in 1998, 1999, and 2005.  At points in its history, the stadium was also home to the Louisville football program, minor league baseball teams, and minor league football teams.

Jim Patterson Stadium

Since partway through the 2005 season, the program has played at Jim Patterson Stadium, located on Louisville's campus.  The venue has a capacity of 4,000 spectators, cost $8.5 million, and is named for businessman and former Louisville baseball player Jim Patterson.  It underwent $4 million renovations prior to the 2013 season to increase its capacity and upgrade its facilities.  It has hosted Eight NCAA Regionals (2009, 2010, 2013, 2014, 2015, 2016, 2017, 2019) and six Super Regionals (2007, 2014, 2015, 2016, 2017, 2019). Jim Patterson Stadium is conveniently located just behind Papa Johns Cardinal Stadium, home of the Louisville Cardinals football stadium. In effort to build JPS, Tino Martinez donated money and has his initials above the press box behind home plate. He is the brother-in-law of former head coach, Lelo Prado.

Head coaches
Dan McDonnell, the program's current head coach, is Louisville's wins leader, with 605. Lelo Prado, the program's head coach from 1996 to 2006, is second, with 320.  John Heldman, who served as head coach for 26 seasons, is the program's longest tenured head coach.

{| border="0" style="width:100%;"
|-
| valign="top" |

Year-by-year records
Below is a table of the program's yearly records.  Louisville's first season of varsity intercollegiate baseball was 1909.  It did not sponsor a team from 1913 to 1919, in 1923 (not enough players), or from 1943 to 1944 (World War II).

Notable former players

The following is a list of notable former Cardinals and the seasons in which they played for the program.

 Nick Burdi (2012–2014)
 Chris Cates (2004–2007)
 Chris Dominguez (2006–2009)
 Adam Duvall (2008–2010)
 Cody Ege (2011–2013)
 Adam Engel (2011–2013)
 Chad Green (2011–2013)
 Sean Green (1998–2000)
 Zach Jackson (2002–2003)
 Dean Kiekhefer (2008–2009)
 Matt Koch (2010–2012)
 Fred Koster (1926–1928)
 Trystan Magnuson (2004–2007)
 Justin Marks (2007–2009)
 Kyle McGrath (2013–2014)
 Brendan McKay (2015–2017)
 Dale Orem (1957–1960)
 Josh Rogers (2014–2015)
 B. J. Rosenberg (2004–2008)
 Will Smith (2014–2016)
 Nick Solak (2014–2016)
 Tony Zych (2009–2011)

See also
 List of NCAA Division I baseball programs
 Louisville Cardinals

Notes

References

External links
 

 
1909 establishments in Kentucky
Baseball teams established in 1909